Submerged is a 2005 American action film directed by Anthony Hickox, who also wrote it with Paul de Souza and produced with Michael P. Flannigan, Daphne Lerner and David Varod. The film stars Steven Seagal, William Hope, Vinnie Jones and Christine Adams. The film was released on direct-to-DVD in the United States on May 31, 2005.

Plot 
Chris Cody (Steven Seagal) is a top-ranked mercenary who took part in an undercover operation to stop a major terrorist strike on U.S. soil; a strike that the UN refused to believe was about to happen. Cody had to break a number of laws in order to do the job, and he is in a military prison.

At the U.S. Embassy in Montevideo, Uruguay, Secret Service agents are briefing the ambassador on a terrorist base when they suddenly go haywire and kill her and then themselves. Later, in Washington DC, intelligence analyst Dr. Chappell (Christine Adams) concludes that some sort of mind control device must have been used. A Delta Force commando team is sent to Uruguay to investigate, but they are quickly ambushed and captured. Taken to the terrorist base, they are brainwashed by Dr. Adrian Lehder (Nick Brimble), a scientist who heads a secret CIA experiment in mind control, programming soldiers to become virtually unstoppable killing machines when they are given the right commands.

The Navy recruits Cody and his talented crew to take Chappell and special agent Fletcher (William Hope) with them in an effort to destroy the facility and take down Lehder. Cody is promised that in exchange, he and his crew will be freed and cleared of the alleged misconduct that they were accused of and receive $100,000 each. Suspicious, Cody quickly jettisons Fletcher, who turns out to be in league with Lehder. Fletcher tips off Lehder, and they quickly abandon Lehder's facility, leaving behind a few American prisoners as Trojan horses.

One team of Cody's men commandeers a submarine, while the others secure the base and rescue the prisoners. The team fights its way past a tank, destroys the base, and escapes on the sub. But they end up stuck on the sub with some of the mind-controlled soldiers. After fighting off the soldiers and escaping from the sub, Cody and his crew realize that they must race to bring down Lehder before the rest of his soldiers claim them all.

Cast

Production
Director Anthony Hickox later said the script was "brilliant... It started life as a full on horror and sci-fi. I just thought wouldn’t it be great if you were stuck at the bottom of the ocean with fucking aliens on your submarine! So that was the original idea, and we story boarded it and we designed the creatures; like these little, mini kind of crab insects that could go down the drains of the submarine so you’d never know when they were coming."

The lead character was supposed to be a bitter old drunken captain. Hickox described his project as "The Thing in a submarine" or "The Thing meets Das Boot".

"It was really interesting," said Hickox. "And then Seagal came on board."

According to Hickox, Seagal said he liked the script but three weeks before shooting was to start Seagal called him and said  "I don't think this movie should be on a submarine". He also wanted an opera scene and said "I've decided I don't like aliens and I don't like monsters. I don't want to be in a monster movie".

The director said "that's why it ended up like it did. We had no clue what we were doing: no script, and the whole mind control thing in the final film was made up the last week before shooting! It was really insane. At that point, again, I should have quit, but I needed the cash."

It was made by Emmett/Furla Films, a wholly owned subsidiary of Family Room Entertainment Corporation.

It is set and filmed in Sofia, Bulgaria in 31 days from August 16 to September 16, 2004.

Alison King said of working on the film: "It was filmed in Bulgaria. He’s a member of the American military and I’m Dimita – the best field op in the business. I’m an action girl with a high pony-tail doing lots of stunts. The stunt guy had worked with Angelina Jolie on Tomb Raider and he showed me how to hang upside down from things, how to jump down into dams and how to strangle people with my knees. It was great fun."

At one stage, the Uruguayan government reportedly considered legal action against the makers of the film for the depiction of their country as a corrupt dictatorship, and the use of the national flag, associating it with terrorist action.

Reception
Vern, reviewing the film for Ain't It Cool News, called it "one of the worst and least entertaining" of Seagal's films.

Home media
DVD was released in Region 1 in the United States on May 31, 2005, and also Region 2 in the United Kingdom on 5 September 2005, it was distributed by Sony Pictures Home Entertainment.

References

External links
 
Submerged at Letterbox DVD

2005 films
2005 action thriller films
2005 direct-to-video films
American action thriller films
Direct-to-video action films
Films about terrorism
Films directed by Anthony Hickox
Films set in Montevideo
Films shot in Bulgaria
Films shot in Uruguay
MoviePass Films films
Nu Image films
Pirate films
Sony Pictures direct-to-video films
Submarine films
Techno-thriller films
2000s English-language films
2000s American films